Sander Olav Rølvåg (born 4 August 1990 in Sandnessjøen, Norway) is a Norwegian curler from Oslo.

Career
Rølvåg represented Norway as a skip at the biennal European Youth Olympic Festival in 2009, winning bronze. In 2011 he was a part of the team that secured a bronze medal at the 2011 World Junior Curling Championships. Rølvåg has represented Norway at the European Curling Championships as an alternate on two occasions, in the 2014 European Curling Championships and the 2015 European Curling Championships. In 2015 he won the gold medal at the 2015 Winter Universiade and won the inaugural 2015 World Mixed Curling Championship.

Honours

2012 World Junior Curling Championships World Curling Federation World Junior Curling Championships Sportmanship Award

Personal life
Rølvåg is employed as a curling instructor, icemaker and commentator.

References

General
All placings and results are sourced by the World Curling Federation's searchable results database:

External links
 

1990 births
Norwegian male curlers
Living people
Universiade medalists in curling
Universiade gold medalists for Norway
Universiade bronze medalists for Norway
Competitors at the 2015 Winter Universiade
Competitors at the 2017 Winter Universiade
Curling ice makers
World mixed curling champions
People from Alstahaug
Sportspeople from Nordland
21st-century Norwegian people